Relief Through Release is the second full-length album released by American band Tura Satana.

Track listing
All songs written by Tairrie B and Scott Ueda, except where noted.
"Welcome To Violence" — 0:09
"Luna" — 3:58
"Dry" (Ueda) — 3:53
"Venus Diablo" — 3:22
"Unclean" — 4:47
"Flux" — 3:46
"Eternalux" — 4:26
"Storage" — 3:50
"Scavenger Hunt" — 3:27
"Negative Creep" (Kurt Cobain) — 2:58
Nirvana cover featuring John Davis of Slick Fifty
"Relapse" — 3:55
"Last Rites" — 3:56
"Omnia Vinat Amor" — 15:05

Personnel
Tairrie B - Vocals
Scott Mitsuo - Guitar
Rico Villasenor - Bass
Marcelo Palomino - Drums
John Davis - Guest Vocals on Negative Creep
Michael Vail Blum - Producer, Engineer, Mixer

1997 albums
Tura Satana (band) albums
Noise Records albums